Below are the squads for the 1995 Bandy World Championship final tournament in the United States.

Group A

Finland

Norway

Russia

Sweden
Coach: Leif Klingborg

References

Bandy World Championship squads